Nerodia erythrogaster, commonly known as the plain-bellied water snake or plainbelly water snake, is a familiar species of mostly aquatic, nonvenomous, colubrid snake endemic to the United States.

Description
The plain-bellied water snake is a large, thick-bodied, solid-colored snake. Subspecies can be brown, gray, olive green, greenish-gray, and black in color. Some lighter colored snakes display dark dorsal blotches. This snake can be distinguished from other water snakes by its plain, unmarked underside varying in color from red to yellow. It gets its common name because it has no marking on its underside. Its scientific name erythrogaster comes from the Greek word “erythros” meaning red and “gaster” meaning belly. This species exhibits geographically defined phenotypic variation which results in a number of different subspecies. Adults vary in size from 24 to 40 inches (76–122 cm) in total length. Juvenile snakes have banding patterns similar to banded water snakes, but can be identified by their unmarked bellies.

Natural habitat
Plain-bellied water snakes are found in every southeastern state of the U.S., from Florida to southeastern Virginia on the east coast, to the borders of eastern North Carolina and western Tennessee, and as far west as Oklahoma and Texas. They are not found in the Appalachian Mountain Range, which excludes them from eastern Tennessee and western North Carolina. The snakes are almost always found near a permanent water source. They are usually seen near rivers and floodplains, lakes and ponds and any natural wetlands in their geographic range.

Behavior and diet
Plain-bellied water snakes are active in the warmest months of the year. During the hottest months of summer, they will be active both during the day and at night. In warmer months, they are typically found basking on logs or near bodies of water, swimming, or traveling over land. During hot, humid weather, they will travel long distances away from water. They tend to spend more time in terrestrial habitat than other water snake species. They hibernate during the coldest months of the winter.

The species gets most of its food from the water. They feed primarily on  fish, crayfish, other crustaceans, salamanders, frogs, and carrion. Because of the amount of time they spend on land, the snake's diet includes a large quantity of amphibians. Like most other snakes, it will hunt for prey, but this species has been observed submerged in water sources waiting for prey to approach them. They apprehend and swallow prey alive without using constriction.

Reproduction
This species bears live young (ovoviviparous) like other North American water snakes and garter snakes. The snake breeds from April until mid-June in the southeast U.S. The female gives birth during the months from August to September. Large broods have been observed, but a typical litter size is around eighteen. One female was observed with a litter of fifty five hatchlings in North Carolina. In 2014 a captive female produced two healthy offspring via parthenogenesis.

Predators and defense
The plain-bellied water snake is prey to both terrestrial and aquatic predators. Reported predators include largemouth bass, kingsnakes, cotton mouths, and several species of egrets, and hawks. Their usual reaction to threats of being captured are: attempts to escape, biting and releasing a foul odor. Unlike the common water snake, the plain-bellied water snake will leave water and try to escape over land if threatened.

Taxonomy
These six subspecies of N. erythrogaster have been historically recognized, including the nominotypical subspecies. However, in 2010, Makowsky, et al. determined that there was "little support for the recognized subspecies as either independent evolutionary lineages or geographically circumscribed units and conclude that although some genetic and niche differentiation has occurred, most populations assigned to N. erythrogaster appear to represent a single, widespread species."

Nerodia erythrogaster alta (Conant, 1963) - plainbelly water snake
Nerodia erythrogaster bogerti (Conant, 1953) - Bogert's water snake
Nerodia erythrogaster erythrogaster (Forster, 1771) - redbelly water snake
Nerodia erythrogaster flavigaster (Conant, 1949) - yellowbelly water snake
Nerodia erythrogaster neglecta (Conant, 1949) - copperbelly water snake
Nerodia erythrogaster transversa (Hallowell, 1852) - blotched water snake

Conservation
The plain-bellied water snake is considered a conservation risk because of loss of wetlands and other anthropogenic factors. 35% of wetlands worldwide have been lost from 1970 to 2015. This species is often struck by vehicles while it crosses highways traveling from one water source to another. They are commonly mistaken for cottonmouths and are consequently killed by people averse to snakes. It is not a protected species in the southeastern states.  In 1997, the subspecies, copper-bellied water snake was designated a threatened species in Ohio, Michigan and northern Indiana under the Federal Endangered Species Act.

References

Further reading
Conant, R. 1975. A Field Guide to Reptiles and Amphibians of Eastern and Central North America, Second Edition. Houghton Mifflin. Boston. xviii + 429 pp.  (paperback). (Natrix erythrogaster, pp. 142–144 + Plate 20 + Map 103.)
Schmidt, K.P., and D.D. Davis. 1941. Field Book of Snakes of the United States and Canada. G.P. Putnam's Sons. New York. 365 pp. (Natrix erythrogaster, pp. 224–225.)
Smith, H.M., and E.D. Brodie Jr. 1982. Reptiles of North America: A Guide to Field Identification. Golden Press. New York. 240 pp.  (paperback). (Nerodia erythrogaster, pp. 154–155.)
Wright, A.H., and A.A. Wright. 1957. Handbook of Snakes of the United States and Canada. Comstock. Ithaca and London. 1,050 pp. (in 2 volumes) (Natrix erythrogaster, pp. 477–490, Figures 141.-143., Map 39.)

erythrogaster
Snakes of North America
Reptiles of the United States
Endemic fauna of the United States
Snake, Plain-bellied Water
Articles containing video clips
Extant Pleistocene first appearances
Taxa named by Johann Reinhold Forster
Reptiles described in 1771